Édouard Schneider (1880-1960) was a French author. He won three prizes from the Académie française: the Prix Montyon for Les Mages in 1912; the Prix Marcelin Guérin for Les heures bénédictines in 1926; and the Prix Brieux for L'Exaltation in 1928.

Works

References

1880 births
1960 deaths
French novelists
French non-fiction writers
French dramatists and playwrights